In number theory, a congruent number is a positive integer that is the area of a right triangle with three rational number sides.  A more general definition includes all positive rational numbers with this property.

The sequence of (integer) congruent numbers starts with

5, 6, 7, 13, 14, 15, 20, 21, 22, 23, 24, 28, 29, 30, 31, 34, 37, 38, 39, 41, 45, 46, 47, 52, 53, 54, 55, 56, 60, 61, 62, 63, 65, 69, 70, 71, 77, 78, 79, 80, 84, 85, 86, 87, 88, 92, 93, 94, 95, 96, 101, 102, 103, 109, 110, 111, 112, 116, 117, 118, 119, 120, ... 

For example, 5 is a congruent number because it is the area of a (20/3, 3/2, 41/6) triangle. Similarly, 6 is a congruent number because it is the area of a (3,4,5) triangle. 3 and 4 are not congruent numbers.

If  is a congruent number then  is also a congruent number for any natural number  (just by multiplying each side of the triangle by ), and vice versa.  This leads to the observation that whether a nonzero rational number  is a congruent number depends only on its residue in the group

,

where  is the set of nonzero rational numbers.

Every residue class in this group contains exactly one square-free integer, and it is common, therefore, only to consider square-free positive integers, when speaking about congruent numbers.

Congruent number problem
The question of determining whether a given rational number is a congruent number is called the congruent number problem.  This problem has not (as of 2019) been brought to a successful resolution. Tunnell's theorem provides an easily testable criterion for determining whether a number is congruent; but his result relies on the Birch and Swinnerton-Dyer conjecture, which is still unproven.

Fermat's right triangle theorem, named after Pierre de Fermat, states that no square number can be a congruent number. However, in the form that every congruum (the difference between consecutive elements in an arithmetic progression of three squares) is non-square, it was already known (without proof) to Fibonacci. Every congruum is a congruent number, and every congruent number is a product of a congruum and the square of a rational number. However, determining whether a number is a congruum is much easier than determining whether it is congruent, because there is a parameterized formula for congrua for which only finitely many parameter values need to be tested.

Solutions

n is a congruent number if and only if the system

, 

Furthermore, if there is one solution (where the right-hand sides are squares), then there are infinitely many: given any solution ,
another solution  can be computed from

,
.

,
.
Another solution is
,
.

.

, and 
from

The above values  produce . The values  give . Both of these right triangles have area .

Relation to elliptic curves
The question of whether a given number is congruent turns out to be equivalent to the condition that a certain elliptic curve has positive rank.  An alternative approach to the idea is presented below (as can essentially also be found in the introduction to Tunnell's paper).

Then set  and
.
A calculation shows

,
A calculation shows these three numbers

we have a one-to-one correspondence between any solution of the two equations in
In particular,
from the equation 
 above is positive.)

Thus a positive rational number  is congruent if and only if the equation
 has a rational point with  not equal to 0.
It can be shown (as an application of Dirichlet's theorem on primes in arithmetic progression)
that the only torsion points on this elliptic curve are those with  equal to 0, hence the
existence of a rational point with  nonzero is equivalent to saying the elliptic curve has positive rank.

Another approach to solving is to start with integer value of n denoted as N and solve

where

Smallest solutions 
David Goldberg has computed congruent square-free numbers less than 104, along with the corresponding a and b values.

Current progress
Much work has been done classifying congruent numbers.

For example, it is known that for  a prime number , the following holds:
if , then  is not a congruent number, but 2 is a congruent number.
if , then  is a congruent number.
if , then  and 2 are congruent numbers.

It is also known that in each of the congruence classes , for any given  there are infinitely many square-free congruent numbers with  prime factors.

Notes

References

 - see, for a history of the problem.
 - Many references are given in it.

External links

A short discussion of the current state of the problem with many references can be found in Alice Silverberg's Open Questions in Arithmetic Algebraic Geometry (Postscript).
A Trillion Triangles - mathematicians have resolved the first one trillion cases (conditional on the Birch and Swinnerton-Dyer conjecture).

Arithmetic problems of plane geometry
Elliptic curves
Triangle geometry
Unsolved problems in number theory